This page details the process of qualifying for the 2008 Africa Cup of Nations.

Qualified teams
The 16 qualified teams were:
 as hosts.
 as group 1 winner.
 as group 2 winner.
 as group 3 winner.
 as group 4 winner.
 as group 5 winner.
 as group 6 winner.
 as group 7 winner.
 as group 8 winner.
 as group 9 winner.
 as group 10 winner.
 as group 11 winner.
 as group 12 winner.

Teams that did not enter
(FIFA World Ranking of 16 May 2007)
 [180]
 [182]
 [192]
 [199]

Team Excluded
(FIFA World Ranking of 16 May 2007)
 [187] had their entry rejected as they had unpaid debts to CAF.

Qualifying round
The 47 nations were divided into 11 groups of four teams and 1 group of 3 teams, with the 12 group winners and the best 3 runners-up from groups with four teams (originally groups 1–11, now groups 2–11 after the withdrawal of Djibouti from group 1) qualifying for the finals. Qualifying took place between 2 September 2006 and 13 October 2007.

Group 1
On 17 August 2006, the Djiboutian Football Federation announced that the Djibouti national team was withdrawing from the qualifying tournament, without giving a reason. All Djibouti matches were therefore cancelled.

Group 2

Group 3

Group 4

Group 5

Group 6

Group 7

Group 8

Group 9

Group 10

Group 11
Zambia finished as group winner by winning the head-to-head against South Africa.

Group 12

Best runners-up (groups 2-11)
The best 3 runners-up from groups with four teams (groups 2-11) would qualify for the finals.

Top goalscorers

Source: Official site - qualifying

References

External links
Draw details at BBC Sport
2008 African Nations Cup qualifying at CAFOnline.com
2008 African Nations Cup at RSSSF
Official MTN African Cup of Nations website
Ghana CAN 2008 - African Cup of Nations News 
Official site - qualifying

Africa Cup of Nations qualification
Qual
Qual
qualification